Thein Lwin (born 8 February 1957) is a Burmese politician who currently serves as a House of Nationalities member of parliament for Kachin State № 10 Constituency. He is a member of the National League for Democracy.

Early life and education 
Thein Lwin was born in Bhamo Township, Kachin State on 8 February 1957. He graduated Law LL.B  from Yangon University. Then, he worked lawyer of the Supreme Court of Myanmar.

Political career
He is a member of the National League for Democracy Party, he was elected as an Amyotha Hluttaw MP, winning a majority of 31065 and elected representative from kachin State No. 10 parliamentary constituency.

References

National League for Democracy politicians
1957 births
Living people
People from Kachin State
Members of the House of Nationalities